In computer science, choreographic programming is a programming paradigm where programs are compositions of interactions among multiple concurrent participants.

Overview

Choreographies 
In choreographic programming, developers use a choreographic programming language to define the intended communication behaviour of concurrent participants. Programs in this paradigm are called choreographies.
Choreographic languages are inspired by security protocol notation (also known as "Alice and Bob" notation). The key to these languages is  the communication primitive, for example
Alice.expr -> Bob.x
reads "Alice communicates the result of evaluating the expression expr to Bob, which stores it in its local variable x".
Alice, Bob, etc. are typically called roles or processes.

The example below shows a choreography for a simplified single sign-on (SSO) protocol based on a Central Authentication Service (CAS) that involves three roles:
 Client, which wishes to obtain an access token from CAS to interact with Service.
 Service, which needs to know from CAS if the Client should be given access.
 CAS, which is the Central Authentication Service responsible for checking the Client's credentials.

The choreography is:
Client.(credentials, serviceID) -> CAS.authRequest
if CAS.check(authRequest) then
    CAS.token = genToken(authRequest)
    CAS.Success(token) -> Client.result
    CAS.Success(token) -> Service.result
else
    CAS.Failure -> Client.result
    CAS.Failure -> Service.result

The choreography starts in Line 1, where Client communicates a pair consisting of some credentials and the identifier of the service it wishes to access to CAS. CAS stores this pair in its local variable authRequest (for authentication request).
In Line 2, the CAS checks if the request is valid for obtaining an authentication token.
If so, it generates a token and communicates a Success message containing the token to both Client and Service (Lines 3–5).
Otherwise, the CAS informs Client and Service that authentication failed, by sending a Failure message (Lines 7–8). We refer to this choreography as the "SSO choreography" in the remainder.

Endpoint Projection 
A key feature of choreographic programming is the capability of compiling choreographies to distributed implementations. These implementations can be libraries for software that needs to participate in a computer network by following a protocol, or standalone distributed programs.

The translation of a choreography into distributed programs is called endpoint projection (EPP for short).

Endpoint projection returns a program for each role described in the source choreography. For example, given the choreography above, endpoint projection would return three programs: one for Client, one for Service, and one for CAS. They are shown below in pseudocode form, where send and recv are primitives for sending and receiving messages to/from other roles.

For each role, its code contains the actions that the role should execute to implement the choreography correctly together with the others.

Development 
The paradigm of choreographic programming originates from its titular PhD thesis.
The inspiration for the syntax of choreographic programming languages can be traced back to security protocol notation, also known as "Alice and Bob" notation. Choreographic programming has also been heavily influenced by standards for service choreography and interaction diagrams, as well as developments of the theory of process calculi.

Choreographic programming is an active area of research. The paradigm has been used in the study of information flow, parallel computing, cyber-physical systems, runtime adaptation, and system integration.

Languages 
 AIOCJ (website). A choreographic programming language for adaptable systems that produces code in Jolie.
 Chor (website). A session-typed choreographic programming language that compiles to microservices in Jolie.
 Choral (website). A higher-order, object-oriented choreographic programming language that compiles to libraries in Java.
 Core Choreographies. A core theoretical model for choreographic programming. A mechanised implementation is available in Coq.
 Kalas. A choreographic programming language with a verified compiler to CakeML.
 Pirouette. A mechanised choreographic programming language theory with higher-order procedures.

See also 
 Security protocol notation
 Sequence diagram
 Service choreography
Structured concurrency
Multitier programming

References

External links 
 www.choral-lang.org

Concurrent computing
Programming paradigms